Anastasia or similar, is the name of several ships and boats.

It may refer to:

 , an Empire Ship and tanker launched in 1942; formerly Empire Fletcher, Backhuysen, Chama; scrapped in 1959
 , a cruiseferry launched in 1986; formerly Olympia, Pride of Bilbao, Bilbao
 , formerly Aria, a superyacht launched in 2001
 , now Wheels, a superyacht launched in 2008